The strumal carcinoid is a type of monodermal teratoma with histomorphologic features of (1) the thyroid gland and (2) a neuroendocrine tumour (carcinoid).

See also 
Struma ovarii
Teratoma

References

External links 

Germ cell neoplasia